West Shores High School is a public high school for grades 7–12. It is located in Salton City, California. The school is part of the Coachella Valley Unified School District. Sea View Elementary shared the same location as West Shores High School until September 2007. The new principal is Dr. Ramirez.

Athletics
FALL
8-Man Football (Varsity)
Volleyball (Varsity, J.V.)

WINTER
Boys Basketball (Varsity)
Girls Basketball (Varsity)
Boys Soccer (Varsity)
Girls Soccer (Varsity)

SPRING
Softball (Varsity)
Baseball (Varsity)
Golf (Varsity)

References

External links
 West Shores High School

High schools in Imperial County, California
Public high schools in California
Public middle schools in California